Cal is a 2013 British-released drama film starring Wayne Virgo, Tom Payne, Emily Corcoran, Lucy Russell, and Simon Cook. The film was written and produced by Christian Martin and Bernie Hodges, and directed by Christian Martin.

Plot
This film is a sequel to the 2009 film Shank. Troubled teen Cal, who was once involved in gang life, has now left and fled his home town Bristol to start living a new life. After Cal's mother falls ill in the hospital he returns to Britain. Cal finds, that, like many other places he has visited on mainland Europe, his hometown has suffered from an economic collapse as well.

Cast 
 Wayne Virgo as Cal
 Tom Payne as Jason
 Emily Corcoran as Aunty Jane
 Lucy Russell as Cath Miller
 Daniel Brocklebank as Ivan
 Bernie Hodges as Journalist - Phil Trope
 Simon Cook as Oncologist (rumored)
 Richard Cambridge as Jim
 Garry Summers as Radio Announcer
 Tony Banham as Policeman
 Deborah Fleming as Nurse
 Anna Gallagher as Ivan's Girlfriend
 Tim J. Henley as Chef

DVD release
The Cal DVD came out on 9 September 2013 in the UK.

Soundtrack
On 15 April 2015, Bristol musician Cliff Airey released three tracks from the Cal soundtrack on Bandcamp.

Filming locations
 An industrial Estate near Pennywell Road, Easton, Bristol
 A now-demolished housing estate, Southmead, Bristol
 Trenchard Street Car Park, Trenchard Street, Bristol
 Skull graffiti building - Ninetree Hill, Cotham, Briston
 Laundrette - Cotham Road South, Cotham, Bristol
 Blackberry Hill Hospital, Fishponds, Bristol
 Montpelier Park, Montpelier, Bristol
 Brandon Hill, The Centre, Bristol
 St Paul's area, Bristol

References

External links
Official website

Cal soundtrack on BandCamp

2013 drama films
British LGBT-related films
Films set in Bristol
LGBT-related drama films
2013 LGBT-related films
2013 films
2010s English-language films
2010s British films